is a former Japanese football player.

Playing career
Kakegawa was born in Kumagaya on May 23, 1973. After graduating from Tokai University, he joined the J1 League club Bellmare Hiratsuka in 1996. He did not play as often as teammate Nobuyuki Kojima. In 1997, he played 9 matches, when Kojima left the club for the Japan national team. Kojima was released from the club due to their financial problems at the end of the 1998 season. In 1999, Kakegawa competed with Seiji Honda for the position and played 10 matches. However, the club finished in last place and was relegated to the J2 League. In 2000, he moved to Vissel Kobe. In 2000, he did not play as often as Jiro Takeda. In 2001, he became a regular goalkeeper. However the club finished in last place in 2005 and was relegated to J2. In 2006, he moved to Shimizu S-Pulse. However, he again did not play often, less than Yohei Nishibe and Kaito Yamamoto. He retired at the end of the 2009 season.

Club statistics

References

External links

1973 births
Living people
Tokai University alumni
Association football people from Saitama Prefecture
Japanese footballers
J1 League players
Shonan Bellmare players
Vissel Kobe players
Shimizu S-Pulse players
Association football goalkeepers